Rithy is a Khmer name meaning "strength". It can be used as a given name or a surname. Notable people with the name include:

Given name
Chan Rithy (born 1983), Cambodian footballer
Chhoen Rithy (born 1965), Cambodian artist
Sok Rithy (born 1990), Cambodian footballer

Surname
Hab Rithy (born 1991), English teacher
Rithy Panh (born 1964), Cambodian filmmaker

Khmer-language names